Jakob Elijah Johnson (born 15 December 1994) is a German professional American football fullback for the Las Vegas Raiders of the National Football League (NFL). He played college football at Tennessee and signed with the New England Patriots in 2019 through the NFL's International Player Pathway Program. After three seasons in New England, Johnson joined the Raiders.

Early life
Johnson was born in Stuttgart, Germany, on 15 December 1994 as Jakob Weinmann. He later took on his father's name Johnson. He played for the Stuttgart Scorpions on the U19 team before moving to Jacksonville, Florida in his senior year of high school. He was a four-star recruit in high school and joined the Tennessee Volunteers as a linebacker. At Tennessee he became a member of the SEC Academic Honor Roll for three consecutive seasons and graduated with a degree in kinesiology. He is a member of Omega Psi Phifraternity

Professional career

Stuttgart Scorpions
Following his graduation from Tennessee in 2018, Johnson returned to the Stuttgart Scorpions of the German Football League where he would play for a year. Johnson had 43 receptions for 474 yards and four touchdowns and rushed 10 times for 46 yards in 12 games played. The Scorpions finished with a 4–12 record on the season.

New England Patriots

Jakob entered the NFL via the International Player Pathway Program and was signed by New England Patriots as an undrafted free agent on 8 April 2019. He was released during final roster cuts on 31 August 2019. After remaining unclaimed in waivers, he was automatically assigned to the Patriots' practice squad for the 2019 season. As the Patriots chose not to register him as an international player, Jakob counted against the 10-man practice squad limit, and was therefore eligible to be signed to the active roster during the 2019 season. He was promoted from the practice squad on 21 September 2019 following an injury to James Develin and became the first International Pathway player to be activated and play in an NFL game. He was placed on season-ending injured reserve on 14 October 2019 with a shoulder injury. In the 2019 season, he recorded one reception for five yards, and took 94 total snaps — 71 on offense and 23 on special teams — in 4 games played.

To start the 2020 NFL season, his second, Johnson made the Patriots 53-man roster out of camp, becoming the second International Pathway player to do so after Efe Obada. In Week 2 of the 2020 season against the Seattle Seahawks on Sunday Night Football, Johnson scored his first NFL touchdown on a one-yard touchdown reception from Cam Newton, becoming the first player from the International Player Pathway to score a touchdown. He also became the first offensive player from Germany and second overall German player to score a touchdown.

On March 25, 2021, the Patriots re-signed Johnson to a one-year contract.

Las Vegas Raiders
Johnson signed with the Las Vegas Raiders on March 17, 2022. He signed a one-year contract extension on March 15, 2023.

Business career

Stuttgart Surge
In February 2022, Jakob Johnson publicly announced his investment in the American football club Stuttgart Surge and he is now a co-owner. In an interview, Johnson said the team could benefit from the current hype and more people could be attracted to watch games at the local stadium. Stuttgart Surge welcomed Johnson's investment, saying he is a role model for young players.

References

External links
New England Patriots bio
Tennessee Volunteers bio

1994 births
Living people
American football fullbacks
New England Patriots players
Players of American football from Jacksonville, Florida
Tennessee Volunteers football players
German players of American football
International Player Pathway Program participants
German Football League players
Expatriate players of American football
German expatriate sportspeople in the United States
Las Vegas Raiders players
Sportspeople from Stuttgart